Hunnum (also known as Onnum, and with the modern name of Halton Chesters) was a Roman fort north of the modern-day village of Halton, Northumberland in North East England. The Latinized Brittonic name “Onnum” may mean "Stream/Water", "Ash (tree)", or “Rock”; if it means "Stream", it may be a reference to the Fence Burn, where a stream touches the line of Hadrian's Wall, but if it means "Rock", it may refer to Down Hill situated to the east of it. It was the fifth fort on Hadrian's Wall, after Segedunum (Wallsend), Pons Aelius (Newcastle),  Condercum and Vindobala. It is situated about seven and a half miles west of Vindobala, and is two and a half miles north of Corstopitum. The site of the fort is bisected by the B6318 Military Road, which runs along the route of the wall at that point.

Description
The fort guards Dere Street as it crosses the Roman Wall through the valley immediately to the west of it. The areas occupied by the northern and southern sections are 4.3 and  respectively. There were four main gates, at the main points of the compass, with double portals with guard chambers. At various times some of the portals have been blocked up and both portals of the west gate were blocked almost at once. There were towers at each corner of the fort, and also on either side of the main gates. It is believed that the fort was built between 122 AD and 126 AD.

The Vallum passed some short distance south of the fort, and was crossed by a road leading from the south gate to vicus just south of the Vallum.

Garrison
A dedicatory slab from the west gate of the fort tells us that the Legio VI Victrix were responsible for the initial building work. The fort was initially garrisoned, probably, by a cohort of 500 partly mounted troops. In the third century it held a regiment of cavalry, the Ala I Pannoniorum Sabiniana, also called Ala Sabiniana, and named after Sabinus who first raised it

Excavations
The field north of the Military Road containing the northern section of the fort was first ploughed in 1827, and a fine bath-house was found. This contained dry and moist hot rooms, a warm room and cold rooms, and a dressing room. Such a large bath-house is a rarity on the Wall.

References

 J. Collingwood Bruce, Roman Wall (1863), Harold Hill & Son, 
 Frank Graham, The Roman Wall, Comprehensive History and Guide (1979), Frank Graham, 
 HUNNUM FORT (ONNUM) Roman-Britain.co.uk 
 https://web.archive.org/web/20070915113454/http://hadrians-wall.info/hadrianswall/onnum/onnum.htm

External links

HUNNUM FORT (ONNUM) On the line of Hadrians Wall as it exists today 

Roman fortifications in England
Roman sites in Northumberland
Forts of Hadrian's Wall
Former populated places in Northumberland